Crime on a Summer Morning is a 1965 French crime film directed by Jacques Deray and starring Jean-Paul Belmondo.
The film is based on the 1963 novel One Bright Summer Morning written by James Hadley Chase.

Plot
Francis and his sister Monique have a shady method for earning money; Monique lures men into her bedroom and shortly after her brother ends up storming in angrily claiming that she is underage. The men then have to pay them off to keep their reputation.

They receive an offer from the bandit Frank Kramer to join in on a kidnapping operation in Spain. Francis and Monique are promised a huge sum which means that they could retire from their petty con games. The target is the daughter of the American billionaire Van Willie.

They manage to kidnap her and confine her in with a retired painter along with his wife and son in Andalusia. But not everything goes according to plan.

Cast
 Jean-Paul Belmondo as Francis
 Sophie Daumier as Monique
 Geraldine Chaplin as Zelda
 Gabriele Ferzetti as Vic Dermatt
 Georges Géret as Zegetti
 Akim Tamiroff as Frank Kramer
 Claude Cerval as Le pigeon
 Adolfo Celi as Van Willie
 Jacques Monod as Lucas
 Germaine Kerjean as Mme. Zegetti
 Analía Gadé as Consuela Dermatt
 Jacques Higelin as Le motard

References

External links

1965 films
French crime films
1960s French-language films
1965 crime films
Films based on works by James Hadley Chase
Films based on British novels
Films directed by Jacques Deray
Films about kidnapping
Films with screenplays by Michel Audiard
1960s French films